Plough Sunday is a traditional English celebration of the beginning of the agricultural year that has seen some revival over recent years. Plough Sunday celebrations usually involve bringing a ploughshare into a church with prayers for the blessing of the land. It is traditionally held on the Sunday after Epiphany, the Sunday between 7 January and 13 January. Accordingly, work in the fields did not begin until the day after Plough Sunday: Plough Monday. Although the nature of farming has changed over the centuries, Plough Sunday is seen as a way of generally celebrating farming and the work of farmers. In the Church of England book of liturgy, Common Worship: Times and Seasons, there is a suggested prayer for the "Blessing of the Plough", for the "Blessing of Seed" and passages of Scripture related to the agricultural theme.

As well as a ploughshare, in rural areas, it is common for local farmers to attend the service with their tractors - both new and old (see photo). Sometimes, services may be accompanied by other traditions such as Morris dancing. Historically, villagers would walk through their village collecting alms, before gathering at the church for the Blessing of the Plough.

Particularly notable Plough Sunday services are held at Sherborne Abbey in Dorset, Hedenham Church in Norfolk, and the cathedrals in Exeter and Chichester.

References

English traditions
January observances
Church of England
Epiphany (holiday)
Christian Sunday observances